Butler SQL is a now-defunct SQL-based database server for the classic Mac OS from EveryWare Development. For much of its history, it was partnered with another EveryWare product, Tango, that built dynamic database pages from SQL data. The product eventually ended up with Pervasive Software, although it is no longer sold.

Butler was introduced to take advantage of new a Mac OS component known as the Data Access Manager (DAM), which was similar in concept to ODBC, allowing end-user client programs to access various data sources. DAM, however, worked at a lower level than ODBC and did not contain any inherent query language. To address the concern that a single DAM program might want to work with different back-end databases, Apple used a second system known as the Data Access Language (DAL), which was a variant of SQL that included additional flow-control and data manipulation instructions. DAL queries were converted to the target database using an adaptor on the server.

Butler was written to natively support DAL as its variant of SQL, and use DAM internally to support networking. As such, it avoided several intermediary layers that would be required to use the same queries on other database servers. Butler 2.0, released in May 1996, added direct ODBC links as well.

Butler suffered from performance problems due to the single-user nature of the Mac OS. In particular, file access was single-threaded and multitasking was coordinated by the applications, not the operating system.

References
 Lawrence Charters, "Data, Data EveryWare", January 1996 General Meeting, Washington Apple Pi
 "EveryWare ships Butler SQL 2.0", Business Wire, 13 May 1996

Discontinued software
Classic Mac OS software
Proprietary database management systems
MacOS database-related software